Rio Grande is a jewelry-making equipment, tools and supplies company located in Albuquerque, New Mexico. Founded in 1944 by jeweler Saul Bell, the company is run by six directors (four of whom are Saul Bell's children). 

Rio Grande, a Berkshire Hathaway Company since 2013, offers a wide range of jewelry-making supplies. While specializing in silver findings and fabrication materials, the company also offers metalsmithing tools and equipment, jewelry displays and packaging products, jewelry workbenches casting machines and kilns, soldering and welding torches, gemstones, diamonds and beadstringing materials. They also supply craft artisans who work in enamels and resins as well as copper and bronze metal clay (COPPRclay and BRONZclay) and silver and gold Precious Metal Clays (PMC). The company annually produces at least two product catalogs, specifically its Gems & Findings and Tools & Equipment books.

The Rio Grande facility includes a large manufacturing area where many sterling silver and other precious metal findings, like jewelry chain, jump rings and split rings, clasps are produced both by fabrication and by casting methods. Since 2010, the entire facility has been solar-powered from nearly five acres of solar panels installed on the property. At the time of construction, the solar array was the largest solar photovoltaic installation in New Mexico with an expected annual output of 1.6 million kilowatt hours of electricity. Rio Grande regularly host jewelry making classes and workshop series for both pro and newbies 

Unlike many corporate structures, Rio Grande is principle-based (guided by 15 overarching principles) rather than rule-based. Employees are encouraged to take an active role in the company's success through its participative management structure. The participative management concept encourages the formation of small groups (teams) of employees organized by their functions roles to execute necessary business tasks and resolve specific challenges as they arise around the company. This unique style of management sprang, in part, from study of the Japanese quality circle movement and strategies from Toyota Production Systems' "Lean Manufacturing" approach.

Notes

References 
Gomelsky, Victoria (2011). Culture Club, JCK Magazine, June 2011.
Heebner, Jennifer (2002). Meet Rio Grande, JCK Magazine, June 2002.

Jewelry retailers of the United States
Tool manufacturing companies of the United States
Manufacturing companies based in Albuquerque, New Mexico
American companies established in 1944
Manufacturing companies established in 1944
Retail companies established in 1944
1944 establishments in New Mexico